23 is a collaboration album by German rap duo 23, composed of Bushido and Sido, released on 14 October 2011 in three different editions: standard, premium and deluxe. Adding all releases from both rappers together it was their 23rd release.

Background 
Bushido and Sido are both successful rappers from Germany. The former friends had a fallout in 2004 when Bushido left their label Aggro Berlin as a result from a dispute with the owners and founders of the label. Afterwards both rappers insulted and dissed each other in public on numerous occasions. Early in 2011, they reconciled after an eight-year hip hop rivalry and began to work on the album.

Singles
Two singles were released: "So mach ich es" and "Erwachsen sein". The video for the first single was shot in Kyiv and directed by Specter one of the former CEOs of Aggro Berlin. The second single features German singer Peter Maffay, who re-sung elements of his 1983 song "Nessaja" from the album Tabaluga oder die Reise zur Vernunft.

Chart performance and sales

Two days after the announcement on 15 August, the album reached number one on the German Amazon music charts and hip hop charts.
The album debuted at number 3 on the German Media Control Charts with first-week sales of 36,897 copies, number 3 on the Austrian Charts, and number 1 on the Swiss Charts. Seven weeks after its release, the album reached gold status in Austria for more than 10,000 units sold. In 2012, the album was certified gold for more than 100,000 units sold.

Track listing 

The deluxe edition contains a DVD and second disc, which features all the instrumentals.

Charts

Weekly charts

Year-end charts

Certifications

References 

2011 albums
Bushido (rapper) albums
Sido (rapper) albums
Collaborative albums
German-language albums